This is a list of rivers in the U.S. state of North Carolina.

By drainage basin 
This list is arranged by drainage basin, with respective tributaries alphabetically indented under each larger stream's name.

Atlantic Ocean 

 North Landing River
 Northwest River
 North River
 Pasquotank River
 Little River
 Perquimans River
 Yeopim River
 Chowan River
 Wiccacon River
 Meherrin River
 Potecasi Creek
 Worrell Mill Swamp
Hares Branch
 Blackwater River
 Nottoway River
 Cashie River

Roanoke River
 Roanoke River
 Dan River
 Aarons Creek
Crooked Fork
 Hyco River
 Castle Creek
 Storys Creek
 Powells Creek
 Ghent Creek
 Cane Creek
 Sargents Creek
 Hyco Creek
 Cobbs Creek
 Kilgore Creek
 Coneys Creek
 Panther Branch
 Lynch Creek
 Negro Creek
 South Hyco Creek
 Little Duck Creek
 Richland Creek
 Cub Creek
 Double Creek
 Sugartree Creek
 Smith River
 Mayo River
 Little Dan River

Albemarle Sound
 Scuppernong River
 Alligator River
 Long Shoal River

Pamlico River
 Pamlico River
 Pungo River

Tar River
 Tar River
Kennedy Creek
Tranters Creek
Cherry Run
Mitchell Branch
Maple Branch
Aggie Run
Pocoson Branch
Pea Branch
Poley Branch
Horsepen Swamp
Haw Branch
Briery Swamp
Great Branch Meadow Branch
Pinelog Branch
Turkey Swamp
Bear Grass Swamp
Collie Swamp
Flat Swamp
Bear Creek
Chapel Branch
Chicod Creek
Juniper Branch
Bates Branch
Cow Swamp
Cabin Branch
Cross Swamp
Grindle Creek
Whichard Branch
Mill Branch
Moyes Run
Cannon Swamp
Baldwin Swamp
Phillippi Branch
Barber Creek
Hardee Creek
Meeting House Branch
Bell Branch
Greens Mill Run
Reedy Branch
Fomes Branch
Parker Creek
Schoolhouse Branch
Harris Mill Run
Johnsons Mill Run
Bryan Creek
Sains Branch
Tyson Creek
Lawrence Run
Conetoe Creek
Mitchell Swamp
Knight Canal
Lewis Canal
Crisp Creek
Fountain Fork Creek
Otter Creek
Cheeks Mill Creek
Town Creek
Bynum Mill Creek
Cokey Swamp
Sasnett Mill Branch
Beaverdam Branch
Millpond Branch
Cabin Branch
Deloach Branch
Dickson Branch
Parker Branch
Little Cokey Swamp
Corn Creek
Williamson Branch
Cattail Swamp
White Swamp
Cattail Branch
Jerrys Creek
Cromwell Canal
Hendricks Creek
Holly Creek
East Tarboro Canal

Fishing Creek
 Fishing Creek
Deep Creek
Longs Branch
Savage Mill Run
Indian Branch
Marsh Swamp
Cow Haul Swamp
Burnt Coat Swamp
Breeches Swamp
Jacket Swamp
Beaverdam Swamp
Dog Pond Branch
Martin Swamp
Rocky Swamp
Jack Horse Swamp
Beaverdam Swamp
Black Swamp
Pinelog Branch
Little Fishing Creek
Bear Swamp
Porter Creek
Reedy Creek
Bobbitts Branch
Bens Creek
Big Branch
Walkers Creek
Dowlins Creek
Crooked Swamp
White Oak Swamp
Shocco Creek
Little Shocco Creek
Cabin Branch
Lees Branch
Buzzard Branch
Maple Swamp
Hogpen Branch
Bobs Branch
Gunters Creek
Reedy Branch
Long Branch
Buffalo Branch
Gum Pond Branch
Mill Branch
Wolfpit Branch
Black Branch
Possumquarter Creek
Richneck Creek
Bridle Creek
Horse Creek
Phoebes Creek
Owens Creek
Rocky Creek
Matthews Creek

Swift Creek
Swift Creek
Leggett Canal
White Oak Swamp
Moccasin Creek
Lane Swamp
Flat Rock Branch
Gideon Swamp
Sandy Creek
Tumbling Run
Jumping Run
Terry Branch
Red Bud Creek
Shelley Branch
Deer Branch
Richland Creek
Crabtree Creek
Devils Cradle Creek
Flatrock Creek
Buffalo Creek
Weaver Creek
Dickies Creek
Cattail Creek
Martin Creek
Pounder Branch
Penders Mill Run
Raccoon Branch
Key Branch
Walnut Creek
Beech Branch
Falling Run
Buck Swamp
Gay Branch
Hornbeam Branch
Compass Creek
Cowlick Branch
Goose Branch
Stony Creek
Pig Basket Creek
Little Peachtree Creek
Big Peachtree Creek
Back Swamp
Beaverdam Branch
Bear Creek
Wildcat Branch
Maple Creek
Polecat Branch
Hicks Branch
Grape Branch
Sapony Creek
Big Branch
Little Sapony Creek
Henry Branch
Gabe Branch
Bear Branch
Jacob Branch
Long Branch
Turkey Creek
Coker Creek
White Creek
Biddie Toe Creek
Cypress Creek
Long Branch
Crooked Creek
Cedar Creek
Big Branch Creek
Camping Creek
Brandy Creek
Jumping Run
Wolfpen Branch
Sycamore Creek
Fox Creek
Coole Creek
Bear Swamp Creek
Buffalo Creek
Lynch Creek
Billys Creek
Kings Creek
Buffalo Creek
Tabbs Creek
Taylors Creek
McGee Creek
Middle Creek
Ford Creek
Gibbs Creek
Sand Creek
Fishing Creek
Coon Creek
Hachers Run
Aycock Creek
Johnson Creek
Bollens Creek
Boulding Creek
Cattail Creek
Jackson Creek
Rocky Creek
Owen Creek
North Fork Tar River
Shelton Creek
Fox Creek
Cub Creek
Moore Swamp

Neuse River
 Neuse River
Swan Creek
Broad Creek
Brown Creek
Brown Creek
Orchard Creek
 South River
Hardy Creek
Big Creek
Mulberry Creek
Old House Creek
Dixon Creek
Coffee Creek
Royal Creek
Little Creek
Eastman Creek
Southwest Creek
Doe Creek
Buck Creek
Duck Creek
Neal Creek
Elishu Creek
Miry Gut
West Fork
East Fork
Rich Island Gut
Pierce Creek
Berrys Creek
Garbacon Creek
Whittaker Creek
Greens Creek
Camp Creek
Smith Creek
Morris Creek
Kershaw Creek
Adams Creek
Godfrey Creek
Delamar Creek
Sandy Huss Creek
Dumpling Creek
Cedar Creek
Jonaquin Creek
Cullie Creek
Kellum Creek
Kearney Creek
Issac Creek
Back Creek
Courts Creek
Great Neck Creek
Long Creek
Dawson Creek
Tarkiln Creek
Granny Gut
Deep Run
Wheeler Gut
Fork Run
Clubfoot Creek
Mitchell Creek
Big Branch
Snake Branch
Gulden Creek
Mortens Mill Pond
East Prong
West Prong
Gatlin Creek
Sassafras Branch
King Creek
Cherry Branch
Alligator Gut
Gum Branch
Handcock Creek
Still Gut
Reeds Gut
Cohooque Creek
Still Gut
Barney Branch
Spe Branch
Little John Creek
Jacks Branch
Dolls Gut
Shop Branch
Deep Branch
Moebucks Branch
Mill Creek
Beard Creek
Caraway Creek
Purifoy Gut
Cedar Gut
East Prong
Slocum Creek
Anderson Creek
Tucker Creek
Sandy Run
Miry Branch
Goodwin Creek
Daniels Branch
Mill Creek
Hunters Branch
Alligator Gut
Cedar Creek
East Prong
Sandy Branch
Caps Branch
Southwest Prong
Wolf Pit Branch
Black Swamp Creek
East Branch
West Branch
Lower Duck Creek
Otter Creek
Crooked Run
Goose Creek
Cypress Creek
Alexander Swamp
Black Creek
Simmons Branch
Deep Run Branch
East Fork
West Fork
Upper Broad Creek
Deep Run
Sasses Branch
Mill Swamp
Morgan Swamp
Possum Swamp
Savannah Bridge Swamp
Northwest Creek
Duck Creek
Scotts Creek
 Trent River
Lawson Creek
 Brice Creek
East Prong
West Prong
Great Branch
Lees Branch
Black Branch
Georges Branch
 Hoods Creek
 Wilson Creek
 Reedy Branch
 Rocky Run
 Miry Hole Branch
 Island Creek
 Scott Creek
 West Prong Raccoon Creek
 Mill Creek
 Goshen Branch
 Little Hell Creek
 Mill Run
 Long Branch
 Beaverdam Creek
 Jumping Creek
 French Branch
 Crooked Run
 Musselshell Branch
 Resolution Branch
 Beaver Creek
 Chinquapin Branch
 Poplar Branch
 Pocoson Branch
 Little Chinquapin Branch
 Jack Cabin Branch
 Mill Branch
 Cypress Creek
 Reedy Branch
 Black Swamp
 Tuckahoe Creek
 Joshua Creek
 Beaverdam Swamp
 Horse Branch
 Running Branch
Smith Creek
Mills Branch
Rennys Creek
Bachelor Creek
Caswell Branch
Round Tree Branch
Beech Tree Branch
Jumping Run
Beaverdam Branch
Deep Branch
Rollover Creek
Hollis Branch
Swift Creek
Little Swift Creek
Fisher Swamp
Beaverdam Swamp
Pine Tree Swamp
Bushy Fork
Bear Branch
Mauls Swamp
Palmetto Swamp
Clayroot Swamp
Creeping Swamp
Polland Swamp
Indian Well Swamp
Thorofare Swamp
Fork Swamp
Simmon Branch
Horsepen Swamp
Gum Swamp
Pinetree Creek
Taylor Creek
Turkey Quarter Creek
Core Creek
Flat Swamp
Mill Branch
Grape Creek
Village Creek
Halfmoon Creek
Grinnel Creek
Alum Springs Branch
 Contentnea Creek
 Eagle Swamp
 Little Contentnea Creek
Middle Swamp
Sandy Run
Pinelog Branch
Oldwoman Branch
Jacob Branch
Black Swamp
Langs Mill Run
Thompson Swamp
Lighter Knot Swamp
Ward Run
Polecat Branch
 Wheat Swamp
Hallam Branch
Mussel Run
Beaverdam Run
Rainbow Creek
Sowell Run
Horsepen Branch
Shepherd Run
Poorhouse Run
Panther Swamp Creek
Tyson Marsh
Spring Branch
Reedy Branch
Mink Point Branch
Jacks Fork
Mill Run
Washington Branch
Fort Run
Lewis Branch
Lang Branch
Nahunta Swamp
Appletree Swamp
Cow Branch
Beaver Branch
Mill Branch
Button Branch
Buzzard Branch
Hams Prong
Beaver Dam
The Slough
Exum Mill Branch
Jimmy Prong
Mocassin Run
Long Branch
Poplar Branch
Buck Meadow Branch
Perkins Old Mill Branch
Beaman Run
Howell Swamp
Water Branch
Watery Branch
Toisnot Swamp
Goss Swamp
Whiteoak Swamp
Buck Branch
Mill Branch
Little Swamp
Beaverdam Creek
Whiteoak Swamp
Black Creek
Aycock Swamp
Mill Run
Great Swamp
Juniper Swamp
White Oak Swamp
Brandy Branch Swamp
Cedar Creek
Lee Swamp
Robin Swamp
Hominy Swamp
Bloomery Swamp
Shepard Branch
Mill Branch
Little Swamp
Marsh Swamp
Buckhorn Branch
Little Creek
Mill Branch
Turkey Creek
Haw Branch
Camp Branch
Big Branch
Driving Branch
Press Prong
Wolfharbor Branch
Moccasin Creek
Bull Branch
Little Creek
Beaverdam Creek
Mosley Creek
Alligator Branch
Snake Hole Branch
Little Snake Hole Branch
Harrys Branch
Folley Branch
Beaverdam Branch
Bone Gray Branch
Stonyton Creek
Jericho Run
Briery Run
Taylors Branch
Southwest Creek
Heath Branch
Mill Branch
Strawberry Branch
Mott Swamp
Spring Branch
Clarks Branch
Hornpipe Branch
Horse Branch
Turkey Branch
Deep Run
Toms Branch
Gray Branch
Adkin Branch
Peter Creek
Falling Creek
Gum Swamp Creek
White Marsh Run
Moseley Creek
Groundnut Creek
Jumping Run
Whitleys Creek
Squirrel Creek
Manley Branch
Vernon Branch
Belch Branch
Bear Creek
Mill Branch
Meeting House Branch
West Bear Creek
Peters Branch
Old Mill Branch
Little Marsh Run
Mill Run
Hullett Branch
Drew Branch
Hinson Branch
Seneca Branch
Hardy Mill Run
Trotters Creek
Frank Nunn Branch
Bens Branch
Tar River
Jacks Branch
Dalys Creek
Panther Creek
John Benton Branch
Cox Creek
South Prong
West Prong
Mill Creek
Still Creek
Walnut Creek
Walker Mill Run
Powell Run
Sleepy Creek
Cabin Branch
Tommy Reed Creek
Burnt Mill Branch
Pine Level Branch
Green Branch
Fellows Branch
Stoney Creek
Billy Branch
Reedy Branch
Howell Branch
Stoney Run
Carroway Creek
Poplar Branch
 Little River
 Walnut Creek
 Crabtree Creek
Marsh Creek
Bridges Branch
Pigeon House Branch
Big Branch
Beaverdam Creek
Mine Creek
House Creek
Hare Snipe Creek
Richland Creek
Sycamore Creek
Reedy Creek
Haleys Branch
Stirrup Iron Creek
Coles Branch
Turkey Creek
 Ellerbe Creek
 Eno River
 Little River
 Flat River
 North River
 Newport River
 White Oak River
 New River

Cape Fear River
 Cape Fear River
 Elizabeth River
 Brunswick River
 Northeast Cape Fear River
 Black River
 South River
 Black River
 Great Coharie Creek
 Little Coharie Creek
 Six Runs Creek
 Donoho Creek
 Bandeau Creek
 Hammonds Creek
 Pemberton Creek
 Mulford Creek
 Turnbull Creek
 Browns Creek
 Ellis Creek
 Bakers Creek
 Harrison Creek
 Phillips Creek
 Georgia Branch
 Willis Creek
 Grays Creek
 Cedar Creek
 Rockfish Creek (Cape Fear River tributary)
 Cross Creek (Cape Fear River tributary)
 Little River
 Juniper Creek
 Upper Little River
 Thorntons Creek
 Buies Creek
 Poorhouse Creek
 Dry Creek
 Neills Creek
 Hector Creek
 Fish Creek
 Little Creek
 Avents Creek
 Camels Creek
 Cedar Creek
 Parkers Creek
 Daniels Creek
 Fall Creek
 Buckhorn Creek
 Bush Creek
 Gulf Creek
 Lick Creek
 Little Shaddox Creek
 Wombles Creek
 Deep River
 Rocky Branch
 Rocky River
 Bear Creek
 Harlands Creek
 Landrum Creek
 Tick Creek
 Meadow Creek
 Varnall Creek
 Loves Creek
 Nick Creek
 Lacys Creek
 Mud Lick Creek
 Greenbrier Creek
 North Rocky River Prong
 Little Buffalo Creek
 Georges Creek
 Big Buffalo Creek
 Cedar Creek
 Patterson Creek
 Pocket Creek
 Indian Creek
 Smiths Creek
 Line Creek
 Big Governors Creek
 McLendons Creek
 Lick Creek
 Tysons Creek
 Scotchman Creek
 Buffalo Creek
 Falls Creek
 Cedar Creek
 Bear Creek
 Grassy Creek
 Fork Creek
 Flat Creek
 Brush Creek
 Richland Creek
 Back Branch
 Broad Mouth Branch
 Millstone Creek
 Mill Creek
 Reed Creek
 Sandy Creek
 Bush Creek
 Gabriels Creek
 Hasketts Creek
 Polecat Creek
 Muddy Creek
 Hickory Creek
 Richland Creek
 Copper Branch
 Bull Run
 West Fork Deep River
 East Fork Deep River
 Haw River
 Shaddox Creek
 New Hope River (submerged)
 New Hope Creek
 Stinking Creek
 Roberson Creek
 Pokeberry Creek
 Brooks Creek
 Wilkinson Creek
 Dry Creek
 Terrells Creek (Left Bank)
 Terrells Creek (Right Bank)
 Collins Creek
 Big Branch
 Cane Creek (Right Bank)
 Cane Creek (Left Bank)
 Marys Creek
 Motes Creek
 Meadow Creek
 Varnals Creek
 Haw Creek
 Big Alamance Creek
 Little Alamance Creek
 Back Creek
 Boyds Creek
 Service Creek
 Stony Creek
 Travis Creek
 Reedy Fork
 Buffalo Creek
 Katie Branch
 Rocky Branch
 Smith Branch
 Squirrel Creek
 Richland Creek
 Long Branch
 Horsepen Creek
 Brush Creek
 Moores Creek
 Beaver Creek
 Giles Creek
 Rose Creek
 Little Troublesome Creek
 Troublesome Creek
 Candy Creek
 Benaja Creek
 Mears Fork
 Rock Branch
 Lockwood Folly River
 Shallotte River
 Calabash River
 Little River

Pee Dee River
 Pee Dee River
 Waccamaw River
 Little Pee Dee River (SC)
 Lumber River
 Drowning Creek
 Hills Creek
 Little Creek
 Mountain Creek
 Quewhiffle Creek
 Aberdeen Creek
 Horse Creek
 Deep Creek
 Big Branch
 Naked Creek
 Jackson Creek
 Lynches River
 Little River
Brown Creek
 Rocky River
Lanes Creek
Little Meadow Creek
Dutch Buffalo Creek
Adams Creek
Little Buffalo Creek
Black Run Creek
Jennie Wolf Creek
Lick Branch
Irish Buffalo Creek
 Cold Water Creek
 Back Creek
Mallard Creek
 Stony Creek
 Toby Creek
 Doby Creek
 Clarks Creek
 Doby Creek
 Coddle Creek
 Wolf Meadow Branch
 Afton Run
 Uwharrie River
 Caraway Creek
 Taylors Creek
Back Creek
Little Caraway Creek
 Little Uwharrie River
 Yadkin River
 Dutch John Creek
 Abbotts Creek
 South Yadkin River
 Little Yadkin River
 Ararat River
 Skin Cabin Creek
 Pilot Creek
 Bull Creek
 Whittier Creek
 Toms Creek
 Flat Shoal Creek
 Oldfield Creek
 Caddle Creek
 Rutledge Creek
 Stewarts Creek
 Burkes Creek
 Beech Creek
 Turners Creek
 Pauls Creek
 Brushy Fork
 Benson Creek
 Moores Fork
 Stony Creek
 Huntington Branch
 Naked Run
 Lovills Creek
 Rocky Creek
 School House Creek
 Seed Cane Creek
 Faulkner Creek
 Champ Creek
 Johnson Creek
 Fisher River
 Davenport Creek
 Pheasant Creek
 Dunagan Creek
 Bear Creek
 Cody Creek
 Little Beaver Creek
 Beaver Creek
 Horns Creek
 Cooks Creek
 Little Fisher River
 Burris Creek
 Flat Branch
 Red Hill Creek
 Endicott Creek
 Sage Creek
 Camp Branch
 Roaring Fork
 Gully Creek
 Mitchell River
 Elkin Creek
 Long Branch
 Grassy Creek
 Grassy Fork
 Little Elkin Creek
 Grays Creek
 Roaring River
 Stewart Creek
 Mulberry Creek
 Reddies River
 Hoopers Branch
 Lousy Creek
 Kilby Branch
 Tumbling Shoals Creek
 Quarry Branch

 Santee River (SC)
 Wateree River (SC)

Catawba River
 Catawba River
 South Fork Catawba River
 Henry Fork
 Jacob Fork River
 Lower Little River
 Middle Little River
 Upper Little River
 Johns River
 Linville River
 Congaree River (SC)
 Broad River
 Pacolet River (SC)
 North Pacolet River
 Bowens River
 First Broad River
 Second Broad River
 Green River
 Hungry River
 Little Hungry River
 Savannah River (SC and GA)
 Seneca River (SC)
 Keowee River (SC)
 Toxaway River
 Horsepasture River
 Whitewater River
 Thompson River
 Tugaloo River (SC and GA)
 Chattooga River
 Tallulah River
 Coleman River
Adams Branch (Richardson Creek tributary)

Gulf of Mexico 

 Mississippi River
 Ohio River (KY, WV)
 Tennessee River (KY, TN)
 Hiwassee River
 Nottely River
 Valley River
 Little Tennessee River
 Tellico River
 Cheoah River
 Tuckasegee River
 Oconaluftee River
 Nantahala River
 Cullasaja River
 French Broad River
 Nolichucky River
 Cane River
 North Toe River
 South Toe River
 Pigeon River
 Swannanoa River
 Mills River
 Little River
 Davidson River
 Ivy River (Creek)
 Holston River (TN)
 South Fork Holston River (TN)
 Watauga River
 Elk River
 Kanawha River (WV)
 New River
 Little River
 North Fork New River
 South Fork New River

Alphabetically 
 Adams Creek
 Afton Run
 Alligator River
 Ararat River
 Back Creek (Rocky River tributary)
 Barkers Branch
 Beaverdam Creek (Lanes Creek tributary)
 Big Branch (Lanes Creek tributary)
 Black River
 Black Run Creek
 Black Jack Branch (Brown Creek tributary)
 Blackwell Branch
 Bluewing Creek
 Bowes Branch
 Brice Creek
 Broad River
 Brown Creek (Pee Dee River tributary)
 Caddle Creek (Ararat River tributary)
 Cane Creek (Hyco River tributary)
 Cane River
 Canebreak Branch
 Cape Fear River
 Carolina Creek
 Cashie River
 Castle Creek
 Catawba River
 Cedar Branch (Lanes Creek tributary)
 Cheoah River
 Chowan River
 Clarks Creek
 Cobbs Creek
 Cold Water Creek
 Coleman River
 Coneys Creek
 Cool Spring Branch
 Cub Creek
 Cullasaja River
 Dan River
 Davidson River
 Deep River
 Doby Creek
 Double Creek
 Elk River
 Eno River
 First Broad River
 Fisher River
 French Broad River
 Great Pee Dee River
 Ghent Creek
 Gold Branch
 Gourdvine Creek
 Great Coharie Creek
 Green River
 Haw River
 Henry Fork
 Hoods Creek
 Hungry River
 Hyco Creek
 Hyco River
 Irish Buffalo Creek
 Jacob Fork
 Jennie Wolf Creek
 Johns River
 Jones Creek
 Kilgore Creek
 Lacey Branch
 Lick Branch
 Lick Branch (Lanes Creek tributary)
 Linville River
 Little Buffalo Creek
 Little Coharie Creek
 Little Duck Creek
 Little Fisher River
 Little Hungry River
 Little Meadow Creek
 Little River (Albemarle Sound)
 Little River (Cape Fear River tributary)
 Little River (Eno River tributary)
 Little River (French Broad River tributary)
 Little River (Horry County, South Carolina)
 Little River (Jacob Fork)
 Little River (Neuse River tributary)
 Little River (North Carolina-Virginia)
 Little River (Pee Dee River tributary)
 Little River (Roanoke River tributary)
 Little Tennessee River
 Little Uwharrie River
 Lockwood Folly River
 Lower Little River
 Lumber River
 Lynch Creek
 Lynches River
 Mallard Creek
 Mayo River
 Meherrin River
 Middle Little River
 Mill Creek (Lanes Creek tributary)
 Mill Creek (Trent River tributary)
 Mills River
 Mill Run (Trent River tributary)
 Mitchell River
 Nantahala River
 Negro Creek
 Neuse River
 New Hope River
 New River – western North Carolina
 New River – southeastern North Carolina
 Nolichucky River
 Norkett Branch
 North Toe River
 Nottely River
 North Pacolet River
 Panther Branch
 Pine Log Creek
 North River
 Northeast Cape Fear River
 Pamlico River
 Panther Branch
 Pasquotank River
 Pee Dee River
 Perquimans River
 Pigeon River
 Powells Creek
 Reddies River
 Reedy Fork (Haw River tributary)
 Reedy Fork (Hyco Creek tributary)
 Richland Creek
 Roanoke River including Staunton River
 Roaring River
 Rocky River
 Rough Butt Creek
 Salem Creek
 Sargents Creek
 Scuppernong River
 Second Broad River
 Shallotte River
 Six Run Creek
 South Fork Catawba River
 South Hyco Creek
 South River
 South River (Neuse River estuary)
 South Toe River
 South Yadkin River
 Stegall Branch
 Stony Creek
 Storys Creek
 Sugartree Creek
 Swannanoa River
 Tar River
 Toby Creek
 Trent River
 Tuckasegee River
 Upper Little River
 Uwharrie River
 Waccamaw River
 Watauga River
 Water Branch
 Waxhaw Branch
 White Oak River
 Whitewater River
 Wicker Branch
 Wide Mouth Branch
 Wilson Creek
 Wiccacon River
 Wolf Meadow Branch
 Yadkin River

See also
List of rivers in the United States

References 
USGS Geographic Names Information Service
USGS Hydrologic Unit Map – State of North Carolina (1974)

External links 
North Carolina Streamflow Data from the USGS

North Carolina
 
Rivers